Alfonso Guerra OP (died 18 June 1596) was a Roman Catholic prelate who served as Bishop of Michoacán (1592–1596) and Bishop of Paraguay (1579–1592).

Biography
Alfonso Guerra was born in Valladolid, Spain and ordained a priest in the Order of Preachers.
On 6 February 1579, he was appointed during the papacy of Pope Gregory XIII as Bishop of Paraguay.
On 9 March 1592, he was consecrated bishop by Toribio Alfonso de Mogrovejo, Archbishop of Lima, with Antonio Avendaño y Paz, Bishop of Concepción; Sebastián Lartaún, Bishop of Cuzco; and Diego de Medellin, Bishop of Santiago de Chile, serving as co-consecrators.
On 9 March 1592, he was appointed during the papacy of Pope Clement VIII as Bishop of Michoacán. 
He served as Bishop of Michoacán until his death on 18 June 1596in Valladolid, Spain.

References

External links and additional sources
 (for Chronology of Bishops) 
 (for Chronology of Bishops)  
 (for Chronology of Bishops) 
 (for Chronology of Bishops) 

16th-century Roman Catholic bishops in Mexico
Bishops appointed by Pope Gregory XIII
Bishops appointed by Pope Clement VIII
1596 deaths
People from Valladolid
Dominican bishops
16th-century Roman Catholic bishops in Paraguay
Roman Catholic bishops of Paraguay
Paraguayan Roman Catholic bishops